The 71st Fighter Generation Squadron is a squadron of the United States Air Force, and part of the 1st Operations Group of the 1st Fighter Wing.  The 71st is stationed at Langley Air Force Base, Virginia. The squadron is equipped with the Northrop T-38, it was also the last squadron of the 1st Fighter Wing to fly the McDonnell Douglas F-15 Eagle, with the 27th and 94th now flying the Lockheed Martin F-22 Raptor.  The squadron is known as "The Ironmen".

History

World War II
The 71st Fighter Training Squadron was founded in December 1940 as the 71st Pursuit Squadron (Interceptor). Initial activation to the 1st Pursuit Group at Selfridge Field, Michigan on 1 January 1941 was definite evidence of America's impending direct involvement in World War II. Initial activation training was accomplished in the P-35. This was changed to the YP-43 Lancer when the squadron was redesignated as the 71st Pursuit Squadron (Fighter) on 12 March 1941. The squadron gained proficiency in the aircraft and the anti-submarine mission while training on the Great Lakes. On 9 December 1941, just two days after the attack on Pearl Harbor, the squadron reported to NAS San Diego in defense of the important Southern California coast. Two months later, the 71st moved north to Los Angeles to transition to the P-38 Lightning and was renamed the 71st Fighter Squadron. June 1942 saw the 71st become the first single-seat, twin engine fighter unit to deploy to England during World War II.

The 71st became the first P-38 unit in combat. Capt John D. Eiland was credited with the squadron's first-ever combat kill after downing a German Focke-Wulf Fw 190 on 4 December 1942.  The pilots were continuously at the forefront of the air battles. Seventeen Campaign Participation Credits were awarded to the 71st and they earned three Distinguished Unit Citations. The squadron claimed 102 kills and produced 5 aces, including one pilot who became an ace in one mission. The 71st Squadron flew under the "Cragmore" callsign during World War II, and its original patch included a skull with lightning bolts in the shape of 71. In June 1943, General Carl Spaatz and General James H. Doolittle traveled to their UK base to present decorations earned in combat. This award ceremony was soon followed by Distinguished Unit Citations presented on 25 August 1943 and 30 August 1943 for escort missions against Italian targets. The squadron was presented another Distinguished Unit Citation by General Nathan Twining in May 1944 for an escort of B-17s against oil installations at Ploieşti, Romania. On 10 June 1944, during an otherwise disastrous low-level bombing mission against the oil refineries by two groups of P-38s, 2nd Lt Herbert "Stub" Hatch, Jr. achieved 5 kills in one mission, all within one minute, causing the gun barrels of his P-38 to melt. Upon completion of its tour in Europe, the squadron was inactivated in Italy on 16 October 1945.

Air Defense Command

On 3 July 1946 the 71st was reactivated as part of the 1st Fighter Group at March Field, California where it took over the personnel, mission and new Lockheed P-80 Shooting Stars of the 31st Fighter Squadron, which was inactivated. The squadron flew the P-80 until 1949 when it converted to North American F-86A Sabre swept-wing fighters.  The following year, as Air Defense Command(ADC) began to deploy its fighter force the squadron was detached from the group and moved twice, finally locating at Greater Pittsburgh Airport, Pennsylvania in October. However ADC was having difficulty under the existing wing base organizational structure in deploying fighter squadrons to best advantage. As a result, the squadron was reassigned to the geographically oriented 4708th Defense Wing and support elements at Greater Pittsburgh were organized into the 81st Air Base Squadron.

In 1953 ADC again reorganized its deployed squadrons and organized the 500th Air Defense Group at Pittsburgh, with the 71st becoming its operational element.  In the summer of 1955 ADC implemented Project Arrow, which was designed to bring back on the active list the fighter units which had compiled memorable records in the two world wars. As a result, the 71st moved on paper to Selfridge Air Force Base, Michigan, where it was reunited with the 1st Fighter Group.

At Selfridge, the squadron re-equipped with rocket armed and airborne intercept radar equipped F-86D Sabre Interceptors.  In 1957 began upgrading to the North American F-86L Sabre, an improved version of the F-86D which incorporated data link to communicate directly with the Semi Automatic Ground Environment, or SAGE analog computer-controlled direction system for intercepts.  The 71st then converted to the supersonic F-102 Delta Dagger interceptor from 1958 to 1960 and the F-106 Delta Dart from 1960 to 1971.

In 1965, the unit won the F-106 category in the William Tell Interceptor Competition. The 71st has been awarded the Presidential Unit Citation 3 times and the Outstanding Unit Award 5 times. In December 1969, the 71st was awarded the 1969 Hughes Achievement Award, presented annually to the most outstanding Fighter Interceptor Squadron in the world. In 1970, one of the F-106's of the 71st glided onto a field in Montana and subsequently became known as the Cornfield Bomber. In 1970, the 71st won the William Tell Competition taking the F-106 category and the overall category for the first time for an F-106 unit.

Tactical Air Command
A major change occurred in July 1971 which encompassed changing aircraft, location, and designation. The squadron was redesignated as the 71st Tactical Fighter Squadron and joined the Tactical Air Command with the 1st Tactical Fighter Wing at MacDill AFB, Florida. It was there that the 71st was equipped with the McDonnell F-4E Phantom II aircraft. During the time the squadron was at MacDill AFB it trained combat fighter crews in the complex F-4 weapon system for deployment to tactical units stationed worldwide. Graduates of the 71st bore the brunt of the battle and participated in the final operations against North Vietnam which terminated the war in Southeast Asia. While graduating over 370 fighter crew members from a complex and demanding combat training environment involving day, night, and all-weather operation, the 71st maintained the high standards of its heritage, receiving three consecutive Tactical Air Command Unit Achievement Awards for a record 4 years of accident-free flying through October 1974. In July 1975, the 71st transferred with the 1st Tactical Fighter Wing to Langley AFB, where it was equipped with the McDonnell Douglas F-15 Eagle air superiority fighter.

In 1976 the 71 TFS assumed the name of "Ironmen" as a result of the fist of mail (knight's armored glove) on the squadron's patch.  1982 saw the 71st become the first TAC squadron fully equipped with the factory new F-15C Eagle aircraft. The 71st routinely deployed throughout the US and Europe to hone its skills during the Cold War.

On 7 August 1990, the 71st deployed to Saudi Arabia with 24 F-15C air-superiority fighter aircraft as the first US combat force to land in support of Operation Desert Shield. Over the next 5 months, the Ironmen flew nearly a year's worth of flying hours, over 13,000 hours and 3,300 sorties—all a prelude to war. In the early morning hours of 17 January 1991, while sweeping the skies near Baghdad, the 71st achieved one of the first aerial victories of Operation Desert Storm and helped pave the way for one of the most significant events in the history of the USAF: complete and total air domination of an adversary, the 71st having flown 1091 missions and 5881 hours in six short weeks. On 7 March 1991, the 71st redeployed to Langley AFB, Virginia.

Air Combat Command

Since the first Gulf War, the 71st successfully supported the UN-sanctioned Operation Southern Watch and Operation Northern Watch in Iraq with many deployments to Saudi Arabia and Turkey. 71 FS pilots defeated dozens of Iraqi surface-to-air missiles (SAM) attacks, and hundreds of anti-aircraft artillery (AAA) attacks while enforcing UN sanctions, without loss or damage to a single aircraft.

In 1992 the 71st FS set the all time flying safety record for the F-15 with 124,790 hours of accident free flying.

Minutes after the 9/11 terrorist attacks on the United States, the 71st launched its F-15s to patrol the skies of the US east coast, intercepting and escorting dozens of airliners to safe landings at airports around the country.  The 71st also had aircraft deployed to Nellis AFB, Nevada at the time of the attacks, and were the first fighters to take to the skies to patrol Las Vegas and southern California.

During the second Gulf War in 2003, Operation Iraqi Freedom, the 71 FS deployed to Tabuk, KSA and flew Combat Air Patrols for the first part of the war, and helped to gain total air superiority for the duration of the conflict.

In 2006, the 71st Fighter Squadron was awarded the coveted Hughes/Raytheon Trophy for Outstanding Aerial Achievement for a record 5th time.

On 1 September 2010 the last F-15s assigned to the 71st departed Langley AFB (slightly ahead of schedule) as a prelude to unit inactivation programmed for the end of September 2010, ending the association of the F-15 at Langley AFB.

On 30 September 2010 the 71st Fighter Squadron was inactivated in a ceremony held in the 71st Fighter Squadron/AMU Hangar at Langley AFB Virginia.

The 71st was renamed the 71st Fighter Training Squadron and reactivated in August 2015, flying the Northrop T-38 Talon. Its mission is to conduct adversarial air training for the F-22s flown by the other squadrons of the 1st Fighter Wing.  This training was previously performed by F-22s of the 27th Fighter Squadron at substantially more expense.

On January 6, 2023, during a unique event combining two squadron activations and two assumptions of command, the 1st Fighter Wing reactivated the 71st Fighter Squadron and established the 71st Fighter Generation Squadron during a ceremony on Joint Base Langley-Eustis, Virginia.

Lineage
 Constituted as the 71st Pursuit Squadron (Interceptor) on 14 December 1940
 Activated on 1 January 1941
 Redesignated 71st Pursuit Squadron (Fighter) on 12 March 1941
 Redesignated 71st Fighter Squadron (Twin Engine) on 15 May 1942
 Redesignated 71st Fighter Squadron, Two Engine on 28 February 1944
 Inactivated on 16 October 1945
 Redesignated 71st Fighter Squadron, Single Engine on 5 April 1946
 Redesignated 71st Fighter Squadron, Jet Propelled on 20 June 1946
 Activated on 3 July 1946
 Redesignated 71st Fighter Squadron, Jet on 15 June 1948
 Redesignated 71st Fighter-Interceptor Squadron on 16 April 1950
 Redesignated 71st Tactical Fighter Squadron on 1 July 1971
 Redesignated 71st Fighter Squadron on 1 November 1991
 Inactivated on 30 September 2010
 Redesignated 71st Fighter Training Squadron on 17 June 2015
 Activated 14 August 2015

Assignments
 1st Pursuit Group (later 1st Fighter Group), 1 January 1941 – 16 October 1945
 1st Fighter Group (later 1st Fighter-Interceptor Group), 3 July 1946 (attached to Eastern Air Defense Force, 15 August 1950 – 24 October 1950, 30th Air Division, 25 October 1950 – 3 June 1951, 103d Fighter-Interceptor Group, 4 June 1951 – 6 February 1952)
 4708th Defense Wing, 6 February 1952
 500th Air Defense Group, 16 February 1953
 1st Fighter Group, 18 August 1955
 1st Fighter Wing, 1 February 1961
 328th Fighter Wing, 16 January 1967
 28th Air Division, 18 July 1968 (attached to 314th Air Division, c. 22 December 1968-c. 9 June 1969)
 24th Air Division, 19 November 1969
 1st Tactical Fighter Wing, 1 July 1971 (attached to 1st Tactical Fighter Wing (Provisional), 7 August 1990 – 8 March 1991)
 1st Operations Group, 1 October 1991 – 30 September 2010
 1st Operations Group, 14 August 2015 – present

Stations

 Selfridge Field, Michigan, 1 January 1940
 San Diego Naval Air Station, California, 9 December 1941
 Minter Field, California, 12 Feb – 20 May 1942
 RAF Goxhill, England, 10 June 1942
 RAF Ibsley, England, 24 Aug – 23 October 1942
 Saint-Leu Airfield, Algeria, 8 November 1942
 Tafaraoui Airport, Algeria, 14 November 1942
 Nouvion Airfield, Algeria, 21 November 1942
 Maison Blanche Airport, Algeria, 17 December 1942
 Biskra Airfield, Algeria, 22 December 1942
 Chateau-dun-du-Rhumel Airfield, Algeria, 16 February 1943
 Mateur Airfield, Tunisia, 28 June 1943
 Detachment operated from: Gerbini Airfield, Sicily, 5–18 September 1943
 Detachment operated from: Gambut, Libya, 5–15 October 1943
 Djedeida Airfield, Tunisia, 31 October 1943
 Monserrato, Sardinia, 29 November 1943
 Gioia del Colle Airfield, Italy, 8 December 1943

 Salsola Airfield, Italy, 9 January 1944
 Detachment operated from: Aghione, Corsica, 11–21 August 1944
 Detachment operated from: Vincenzo Airfield, Italy, 10 Jan – 18 February 1945
 Lesina Airfield, Italy, 14 March 1945
 Marcianise, Italy, 26 September 1845 – 16 October 1945
 March Field (later March Air Force Base), California, 3 July 1946
 George AFB, California, 18 July 1950
 Griffiss AFB, New York, 15 August 1950
 Greater Pittsburgh Airport, Pennsylvania, 21 October 1950
 Selfridge Air Force Base, Michigan, 18 August 1955
 Richards-Gebaur Air Force Base, Missouri, 16 January 1967
 Malmstrom Air Force Base, Montana, 18 July 1968
 Deployed at: Osan AB, South Korea, c. 22 December 1968-c. 9 June 1969
 MacDill Air Force Base, Florida, 1 July 1971
 Langley Air Force Base, Virginia, 30 June 1975 – 30 September 2010
 Operated from King Abdul Aziz Air Base, Saudi Arabia
 Langley Air Force Base, Virginia, 14 August 2015 – present

Aircraft

 Seversky P-35, 1941
 YP-43 Lancer, 1941
 P-38 Lightning, 1941–1945
 Lockheed P-80 (later F-80) Shooting Star, 1946–1949
 North American F-86A Sabre, 1949–1953
 F-86D Sabre Interceptor, 1953–1957

 F-86L Sabre Interceptor (SAGE) 1957–1958
 F-102 Delta Dagger, 1958–1960
 F-106 Delta Dart, 1960–1971
 F-4 Phantom II, 1971–1975
 F-15 Eagle, 1976–2010
 T-38A/B Talon, 2015–present

Campaigns
 World War II: Antisubmarine, American Theater; Egypt-Libya; Air Offensive, Europe; Algeria-French Morocco; Tunisia; Sicily; Naples-Foggia; Anzio; Rome-Arno; Normandy; Northern France; Southern France; North Apennines; Rhineland; Central Europe; Po Valley; Air Combat, EAME Theater.
 Southwest Asia: Defense of Saudi Arabia; Liberation and Defense of Kuwait

Popular culture
In the 2007 movie Transformers, the Decepticon Starscream, disguised as an F-22 Raptor, bears the fuselage and tail markings of the Air Combat Command, the 1st Fighter Wing the 71st, 94th and 27th; All current Air Force fighter aircraft unit Wing Flagship aircraft display all squadrons contained within the wing; however, as previously noted, the 71st has not switched to the F-22.

References

 Notes

 Citations

Bibliography

 Buss, Lydus H.(ed), Sturm, Thomas A., Volan, Denys, and McMullen, Richard F., History of Continental Air Defense Command and Air Defense Command July to December 1955, Directorate of Historical Services, Air Defense Command, Ent AFB, CO, (1956)
 
  Grant, C.L., (1961) The Development of Continental Air Defense to 1 September 1954, USAF Historical Study No. 126

Further reading

External links

 71st FS's Official Webpage

071
Military units and formations in Virginia
0071